Jennifer Brozek (born December 9, 1970) is an American freelance author, game design writer, editor, and small press publisher.

Career
Before becoming a full-time writer, Brozek was a software QA engineer working on a wide range of projects, including video games. Brozek co-chaired one of the first Babylon 5 science fiction conventions (StarQuest '95). She was the basis for a main character in the webcomic Casey and Andy by Andy Weir, named Jenn Brozek, who is listed as a 200-point GURPS character in the role-playing game GURPS Casey and Andy.

Brozek began her professional writing career in 2004. She was the editor-in-chief of the semiprozine, The Edge of Propinquity, a webzine that published for six years, and worked as an assistant editor, sounding board, and convention volunteer for the Apex Book Company. Brozek is now the creative director of Apocalypse Ink Productions and a member of International Association of Media Tie-in Writers (IAMTW), the Horror Writers Association, and the Science Fiction and Fantasy Writers of America (SFWA). She served as SFWA Director-at-Large from 2015 to 2017.

Brozek's work in fiction and editing has won and been nominated for several awards, such as the Bram Stoker Award, British Fantasy Award, Scribe Award, ENnie, Origins Award, and Hugo.

Books

Fiction
2020
BattleTech: Ghost Hour, Rogue Academy #2, June 2020
Shadowrun: A Kiss to Die For, June 2020

2019
Makeda Red, Shadowrun novel - Catalyst Game Labs, July 2019
BattleTech: Iron Dawn, Rogue Academy #1 - Catalyst Game Labs, April 2019
A Secret Guide to Fighting Elder Gods (editor) - Pulse Publishing, April 2019

2018 
To Fight the Black Wind, Arkham Horror novella - Fantasy Flight Games, April 2018
A is for Apex, ABC Book for Your Little Mad Scientist - Apocalypse Ink Productions, August 2018
The Prince of Artemis V, All-ges science-fantasy comic book - Apocalypse Ink Productions, February 2018

2017
Five Minute Stories, flash fiction collection - Apocalypse Ink Productions, September 2017

2016
The Last Days of Salton Academy, novel - Ragnarok Productions, October 2016
Colonial Gothic: Lost Tales collection - Rogue Games, April 2016
Karen Wilson Chronicles, omnibus of the Karen Wilson Chronicles Series - Apocalypse Ink Productions, March 2016
Never Let Me, omnibus of the Melissa Allen series - Permuted Press, January 2016

2015
Never Let Me Die, Book 3 of the Melissa Allen series - Permuted Press, December 2015
Never Let Me Leave, Book 2 of the Melissa Allen series - Permuted Press, November 2015
 Chimera Incarnate: Book Four of the Karen Wilson Chronicles, novel - Apocalypse Ink Productions, March 2015
 DocWagon 19, Shadowrun novella - Catalyst Game Labs, March 2015
 Never Let Me Sleep, Book 1 of the Melissa Allen series, young adult SF-thriller novel - Permuted Press, TBA 2015 
 The Last Days of Salton Academy - Ragnarok Publications, TBA

2014
 The Nellus Academy Incident, YA BattleTech novel - Catalyst Game Labs, January 2014
 Keystones: Book Three of the Karen Wilson Chronicles, novel - Apocalypse Ink Productions, April 2014

2013
 Children of Anu: Book Two of the Karen Wilson Chronicles, mosaic novel - Apocalypse Ink Productions, June 2013

2012
 The Lady of Seeking in the City of Waiting, Shadeside novella - Dark Quest Books, February 2012
 Caller Unknown: Book One of the Karen Wilson Chronicles , mosaic novel - Apocalypse Ink Productions, November 2012

2011
 Shanghai Vampocalypse hard copy - Savage Mojo, Author, August 2011

2010
 In a Gilded Light: 105 Tales of the Macabre, Dark Quest Books, 2010

Nonfiction
The Little Finance Book That Could, Book Shaker, 2010 
Industry Talk: An Insider's Look at Writing RPGs and Editing Anthologies, Apocalypse Ink Productions, 2012

Awards and nominations

References

External links

 The Edge of Propinquity
 
 Jennifer Brozek Interview at Prachesta Magazine
 

1970 births
21st-century American novelists
American fantasy writers
American horror writers
American science fiction writers
American women short story writers
American women novelists
Living people
Novelists from Washington (state)
Women science fiction and fantasy writers
Women horror writers
21st-century American women writers
21st-century American short story writers
Role-playing game writers
Electronic literature writers